Dr John Francis Leader, also known as JFL, is an Irish psychologist and cognitive scientist who researches at University College Dublin, specialises in personal leadership, experiential learning and mixed reality therapy, and is the host of #bodymindself.

Combining multimedia techniques with current psychological research, Leader's work aims to make therapy more fun, immersive and effective—a type of theme park meets therapy experience.

John contributes to discussions about wellbeing and personal leadership in the media, and delivers keynote speeches and conducts organisational training programmes around these topics.

References

External links
 John Francis Leader's official website

Irish psychologists
Living people
Year of birth missing (living people)
Scientists from Dublin (city)